Missouri City Savings Bank Building and Meeting Hall, also known as the Nowlin Store Building, is a historic commercial building located in Missouri City, Clay County, Missouri. Built circa 1858, it is the oldest and largest remaining commercial structure in Missouri City, featuring shops on the first level and private spaces on the second. It was named to the National Register of Historic Places in 2010.

References

Commercial buildings on the National Register of Historic Places in Missouri
Commercial buildings completed in 1858
Buildings and structures in Clay County, Missouri
National Register of Historic Places in Kansas City, Missouri